Count Erik Melcher Schering "Ted" Wachtmeister (14 July 1892 – 18 December 1975) was a Swedish jurist, reserve officer and rower who competed in the 1912 Summer Olympics.

Career
Wachtmeister was born at Tistad Castle, in Nyköping Municipality, Sweden, the son of son Chancellor, Count Fredrik Wachtmeister and Baroness Louise af Ugglas. He passed studentexamen at Lundsbergs boarding school in 1911 and received a Candidate of Law degree from Uppsala University in 1918. Wachtmeister served as an attaché at the Ministry for Foreign Affairs from 1918 to 1922. He became a reserve officer in 1915 and was commissioned as a fänrik in the reserve of the Crown Prince's Hussar Regiment (K 7) the same year 1915. He was promoted to underlöjtnant in 1918, to lieutenant in 1923 and then served as ryttmästare in the cavalry reserve from 1942 to 1959.

As a rower, Wachtmeister competed in the 1912 Summer Olympics. He was a member of the Swedish boat Roddklubben af 1912 which was eliminated in the quarter-finals of the men's eight tournament.

Wachtmeister was chairman of the board of Jönåkers häradsallmänning from 1933, Södermanlands läns brandförsäkringsbolag from 1946 to 1963, Skandinaviska Banken's branch office in Nyköping from 1954 to 1963 and held various municipal assignments until 1951.

Personal life
He owned and lived in Nääs manor.

Wachtmeister married the first time in 1920 to Margaretha Huitfeldt (1900–1926), the daughter of commander Hugo Huitfeldt and Signe Stang. He married a second time in 1929 to Adrienne De Geer (1908–1996), the daughter of major Wilhelm De Geer and Thomasine Funck. In the first marriage he was the father of Bengt (1921–2006) and Nils (1923–2003), and in the second of Thomas ("Tom") (1931–2011), Ian (1932–2017), Georg (born 1940) and Sten (born 1945).

Awards
Knight of the Order of Vasa (1954)
Knight of the Order of Civil Merit

References

1892 births
1975 deaths
Swedish counts
Swedish male rowers
Olympic rowers of Sweden
Rowers at the 1912 Summer Olympics
Uppsala University alumni
People from Nyköping Municipality
Knights of the Order of Vasa
Ted
Sportspeople from Södermanland County